Hedwig Mathilde Plümacher (3 December 1919 – 3 June 2005) was a German operatic singer who appeared on stage as Hetty Plümacher. A long-term member of the Staatstheater Stuttgart, she also performed at international festivals and major opera houses, as well as recording music.

Career 
Hedwig Mathilde Plümacher was born in Solingen, and studied voice at the Musikhochschule Köln. After her first engagement in Oslo in 1943, she was member of the ensemble of the Staatstheater Stuttgart from 1946 to 1976. She often performed in Munich and Vienna, but gradually made her way into all major European opera houses.

Plümacher appeared at the Salzburg Festival from 1963 to 1965, at the Bayreuth Festival from 1953 to 1957, and at the Schwetzingen Festival in 1957.

Her main roles were initially in operas by Mozart and Richard Strauss, later she also played dramatic roles in Wagner operas. She was also a sought-after concert soloist for the Passions by Johann Sebastian Bach, the oratorios by Handel and Felix Mendelssohn, and Verdi's Requiem.

In opera, Plümacher sang mezzo-soprano and contralto.

After leaving the stage she taught as a professor at the Mozarteum in Salzburg and at the Staatliche Hochschule für Musik und Darstellende Kunst Stuttgart.

When she married her name was Hedwig Mathilde Lipp.

On 3 December 2005, at the age of 85, Plümacher died at her long-time residence in Steinenbronn. Her grave is in Dettenhausen.

Recordings 
 Richard Strauss: Die schweigsame Frau – Wiener Philharmoniker, conducted by Karl Böhm, with Fritz Wunderlich, Hermann Prey, Hetty Plümacher, Hilde Güden. Deutsche Grammophon (Universal)
 Wagner Parsifal – Hans Knappertsbusch 1954, with Josef Greindl, Wolfgang Windgassen, Hetty Plümacher. Archipel 4CDs ARPCD 0283
 Hetty Plümacher – Arias from The Marriage of Figaro, La clemenza di Tito, Il turco in Italia, Mignon, The Merry Wives of Windsor, The Tales of Hoffmann, Madama Butterfly, La Cenerentola, Samson and Delilah, La forza del destino, Die toten Augen, Der Bettelstudent and Oberon. uraCant 2055, Broadcast Performances, 1949–61
 Offenbach: Hoffmanns Erzählungen – Hans Müller-Kray, with Hetty Plümacher. Rec. 1949/Walhall Eternity /2 CDs
 Wagner: Der Ring des Nibelungen – Wiener Philharmoniker, conducted by Sir Georg Solti, with George London, Hetty Plümacher, Kirsten Flagstad, Waldemar Kmentt, Gottlob Frick. Decca
 Mozart Die Zauberflöte – Wiener Philharmoniker, Sir Georg Solti, with Cristina Deutekom, Dietrich Fischer-Dieskau, Hetty Plümacher (Third Lady), Hermann Prey, Renate Holm, Gerhard Stolze, René Kollo. DECCA 479/81 Stereo, Box, 3 LPs + Book – AA
 Wolfgang Fortner: Bluthochzeit, with Hetty Plümacher. Immortal DVD Cat. No. – IMM950017
 Weber: Oberon – Wilhelm Schüchter, mit Hetty Plümacher. Eurodisc 70828 1LP (1964)
 Puccini: Madama Butterfly – Ferdinand Leitner 1960, with Anny Schlemm, Sándor Kónya, Hetty Plümacher, Kim Borg. Deutsche Grammophon
 Mozart: Così fan tutte
 Flotow: Martha – with Wilma Lipp, Hetty Plümacher. Relief CD album (2 volumes), 02/2006
 Marschner: Hans Heiling – Joseph Keilberth, with Hermann Prey, Hetty Plümacher. MYTO RECORDS 2 MCD 005.232
 d'Albert: Die toten Augen – with Marianne Schech, Wolfgang Windgassen, Hetty Plümacher. Myto Historical Series 00152

References

External links 
 
 
 
 Hetty Plümacher (Mezzo-soprano, Contralto), Bach Cantatas Website

1919 births
2005 deaths
People from Solingen
German operatic mezzo-sopranos
German operatic contraltos
Academic staff of Mozarteum University Salzburg
Voice teachers
Women music educators
20th-century German women singers